The 2013–14 All-Ireland Junior Club Football Championship was the 13th staging of the All-Ireland Junior Club Football Championship since its establishment by the Gaelic Athletic Association.

The All-Ireland final was played on 9 February 2014 at Croke Park in Dublin, between Two Mile House and Fuerty. Two Mile House won the match by 5-07 to 1-11 to claim their first ever championship title.

All-Ireland Junior Club Football Championship

All-Ireland final

References

2013 in Irish sport
2014 in Irish sport
All-Ireland Junior Club Football Championship
All-Ireland Junior Club Football Championship